Caprese Michelangelo is a village and comune in the province of Arezzo, Tuscany, Italy. It is the birthplace of the  Renaissance artist Michelangelo. The village is situated in the Valtiberina or High Tiber Valley.

Sights include the 13th-century church of St. John the Baptist, where Michelangelo was baptized; the ancient churches of San Cristoforo a Monna, San Paolo a Monna and Santi Ippolito and Cassiano; the abbey of San Martino a Tifi; the Michelangelo Museum and Library.

References

Cities and towns in Tuscany
Michelangelo